Flying Padre is a 1951 short subject black-and-white documentary film. It is the second film directed by Stanley Kubrick. The film is nine minutes long and was completed shortly after Kubrick had completed his first film for RKO, the short subject Day of the Fight (1951). The studio offered him a follow-up project for their Screenliner series.

Synopsis
The subject of Flying Padre is a Catholic priest in rural New Mexico, Reverend Fred Stadtmueller. Known to his parishioners as the "Flying Padre", his 4,000-square mile parish is so large, he uses a Piper Cub aircraft (named the Spirit of St. Joseph) to travel from one isolated settlement to another.

The film shows two days in his daily life, with the Reverend providing spiritual guidance, saying a Funeral Mass, and other glimpses of his life such as his breakfast routine at the parish house. His days include a funeral service for a ranch hand, and counseling of two young parishioners who have been quarrelling. In the climax of the film. the "Flying Padre" also operated as an impromptu air ambulance by flying a sick child and his mother to hospital.

Cast
 Bob Hite as himself - Narrator (voice)
 Reverend Fred Stadtmueller as himself
 Pedro as himself

Production
After Kubrick sold his first short film, the self-financed Day of the Fight, to RKO in 1951 for $4,000 (pocketing a $100 profit), the company advanced the 23-year-old filmmaker money to make a follow-up project, a documentary short for their Pathe Screenliner series which specialized in short human-interest documentaries. He originally wanted to call the film Sky Pilot but the studio did not like the title.

Flying Padre is narrated by CBS announcer Bob Hite.

Reception
In an interview in 1969, Kubrick referred to Flying Padre as a "silly thing". Flying Padre, however, was an important landmark in his budding career as a filmmaker. "It was at this point that I formally quit my job at Look to work full time on filmmaking," Kubrick stated in an interview."

References

Notes

Citations

Bibliography

 Gelmis, Joseph. The Film Director as Superstar. New York: Doubleday, 1970. .

External links
 
 
 Flying Padre at Kubrick: Master Filmmaker
 Flying Padre at Kubrick Multimedia Film Guide
 Flying Padre (Translated from French to English by Google)
 The Kubrick Site

1951 films
American short documentary films
American aviation films
American black-and-white films
Documentary films about aviation
Films directed by Stanley Kubrick
RKO Pictures short films
1950s short documentary films
1951 documentary films
Films scored by Nathaniel Shilkret
1950s English-language films
1950s American films